Raúl Bernao (4 November 1941 – 26 December 2007) was an Argentine footballer. He played most of his career for Club Atlético Independiente winning a number of major titles, he also played for the Argentina national football team 15 times.

Career
Bernao started his career with Independiente in 1961, he was part of the squad that won the 1963 championship. In 1964, he helped Independiente to become the first Argentine team to win the Copa Libertadores and the club retained the title in 1965.

In 1967, Independiente were the first team to win the Nacional and in 1970 they won the Metropolitano.

Bernao left Independiente to join Colombian team Deportivo Cali in 1971, he played for the club until the end of 1973. He returned to Argentina to join Gimnasia y Esgrima La Plata in 1974, but retired at the age of 33 after only playing in 10 Primera matches for Gimnasia.

Bernao appeared for the Argentina national football team in two editions of the Copa América.

Titles

References

External links
 
  
 Short obituary 

1941 births
2007 deaths
Sportspeople from Avellaneda
Argentine footballers
Association football midfielders
Club Atlético Independiente footballers
Deportivo Cali footballers
Club de Gimnasia y Esgrima La Plata footballers
Argentina international footballers
1967 South American Championship players
Argentine Primera División players
Categoría Primera A players
Argentine expatriate footballers
Expatriate footballers in Colombia